Kau Bintangku is the fourth studio album from Malaysian singer Francissca Peter released in 1987.

Controversy
 The album was almost banned as the cover had her wearing a crucifix. 
 Instigated by a small group of people who did not like the fact that a non Malay was popular with many Malay-Muslim fans in Malaysia, they tried to get the album banned but Warner Music decided to digitally touch up the album cover and put it back on the shelves. 
 Consequently, the album went Platinum.

Track listing

References

External links 
 Official Website
 Official Youtube

1986 albums
Francissca Peter albums
Warner Music Group albums
Malay-language albums